Cyril Clement Goodway (10 July 1909 – 22 May 1991) was an English cricketer active from 1937 to 1953 who played for Warwickshire. He was born in Smethwick, Staffordshire, and died in Birmingham. He appeared in 40 first-class matches as a righthanded batsman and wicketkeeper. He scored 434 runs with a highest score of 37 not out and completed 43 catches with 22 stumpings. He was President of the Birmingham and District Cricket League in 1961.

Notes

 
1909 births
1991 deaths
English cricketers
Warwickshire cricketers
Staffordshire cricketers